Francis Harris (5 April 1908 – 1958) was an English professional footballer. He was born in Catshill.

Harris began his football career at non-league sides Cradley Heath and Bromsgrove Rovers while working as a mechanic. In 1928, he signed for Cardiff City, scoring on his home debut in a 2–1 win over Leicester City. It took him several years to fully establish himself in the side as numerous minor injuries forced him in and out of the first team before missing just two games during the 1931–32 season. In 1933, he was sold to Charlton Athletic, who were also suffering from a slump in recent years but Harris was part of the team that helped the club win two consecutive promotions to return to the top flight. After leaving Charlton he played at Brierley Hill Alliance.

References

1908 births
1958 deaths
Sportspeople from Bromsgrove
English footballers
Association football wing halves
Cradley Heath F.C. players
Bromsgrove Rovers F.C. players
Cardiff City F.C. players
Charlton Athletic F.C. players
Brierley Hill Alliance F.C. players
English Football League players